Harry Hurst (May 26, 1918 – ) was a Canadian boxer who competed in the 1938 British Empire Games.

He was born in Manchester, United Kingdom of Great Britain and Ireland. He boxed out of Montreal.

In 1938 he won the silver medal in the lightweight class after losing the final to Harry Groves.

External links

1918 births
1979 deaths
Boxers from Manchester
Boxers from Montreal
Anglophone Quebec people
British emigrants to Canada
Lightweight boxers
Welterweight boxers
Boxers at the 1938 British Empire Games
Commonwealth Games silver medallists for Canada
Canadian male boxers
Commonwealth Games medallists in boxing
English male boxers
Medallists at the 1938 British Empire Games